The Masked Woman is a lost 1927 silent film melodrama produced and distributed by First National Pictures. Filmed in France, it was the last screenwriting effort of famed June Mathis, who died in 1927, and was directed by her husband Silvano Balboni, usually a cinematographer. Anna Q. Nilsson, Holbrook Blinn and serial veteran Ruth Roland star.

Cast
Anna Q. Nilsson - Diane Delatour
Holbrook Blinn - Baron Tolento
Einar Hanson - Dr. Rene Delatour (*as Einar Hansen)
Charlie Murray - Andre O'Donohue
Gertrude Short - Mimi
Ruth Roland - Dolly Green
R. O. Pennell - Monsieur Lapoule (as Richard Pennell)
Cora Macey - Matron
Paulette Day - Baby

References

External links
The Masked Woman at IMDb.com
allmovie/synopsis

1927 films
American silent feature films
Lost American films
Lost drama films
1927 drama films
Silent American drama films
American black-and-white films
American films based on plays
First National Pictures films
Films with screenplays by Gerald Duffy
1927 lost films
1920s American films